Narcissus gaditanus is a species of the genus Narcissus (daffodils) in the family Amaryllidaceae. It is classified in Section Juncifolii, and is native to the southern Iberian Peninsula.

Etymology
The specific epithet, gaditanus, means "pertaining to Gades" (now Cadiz).

References

gaditanus
Garden plants
Flora of Spain
Taxa named by Pierre Edmond Boissier
Taxa named by George François Reuter